Bayview Hill is a prominent hill contained within Bayview Park in San Francisco, California.

Bayview Hill may also refer to:

Bayview Hill, Ontario, a neighborhood in Richmond Hill, Ontario, part of the Greater Toronto Area
Bayview Hill Elementary School, a school in Richmond Hill, Ontario

See also
Bayview (disambiguation)
Bay View (disambiguation)